The Columbia Bridge is a covered bridge, carrying Columbia Bridge Road over the Connecticut River between Columbia, New Hampshire and Lemington, Vermont.  Built in 1911–12, it is one of only two New Hampshire bridges (along with the Mount Orne Covered Bridge) built with Howe trusses, and is one of the last covered bridges built in the historic era of covered bridge construction in both states.  It was listed on the National Register of Historic Places in 1976.

Description and history
The Columbia Bridge stands in southeastern Lemington and northwestern Columbia, both rural communities in the northern parts of their respective states. It carries Columbia Bridge Road between United States Route 3 in New Hampshire and Vermont Route 102 in Vermont. It is in a rural agricultural setting, and is oriented northwest-to-southeast across the Connecticut River, on abutments of dry laid stone that have been faced in concrete. The exterior is sheathed in vertical board siding, which extends a short way into each portal to protect the truss ends.

The bridge was built by Charles Babbitt in 1912, replacing one destroyed by fire the previous year, and is the third to stand on the site.  The bridge is considered to be one of the last built in either state during the historic period of covered bridge construction.  It was rehabilitated by the state of New Hampshire in 1981 at a cost of $143,000.

See also 

 List of crossings of the Connecticut River
 List of covered bridges in New Hampshire
 List of bridges on the National Register of Historic Places in New Hampshire
 National Register of Historic Places listings in Coös County, New Hampshire
 List of covered bridges in Vermont
 List of bridges on the National Register of Historic Places in Vermont
 National Register of Historic Places listings in Essex County, Vermont

References

External links 
 
Columbia Bridge, NH Division of Historical Resources

Buildings and structures in Lemington, Vermont
Bridges over the Connecticut River
Bridges completed in 1912
Covered bridges on the National Register of Historic Places in New Hampshire
Covered bridges on the National Register of Historic Places in Vermont
Tourist attractions in Coös County, New Hampshire
Bridges in Coös County, New Hampshire
Bridges in Essex County, Vermont
Tourist attractions in Essex County, Vermont
1912 establishments in New Hampshire
National Register of Historic Places in Coös County, New Hampshire
National Register of Historic Places in Essex County, Vermont
Road bridges on the National Register of Historic Places in New Hampshire
Road bridges on the National Register of Historic Places in Vermont
Wooden bridges in New Hampshire
Wooden bridges in Vermont
Howe truss bridges in the United States
1912 establishments in Vermont
Interstate vehicle bridges in the United States